Alejandro Claverías Gutiérrez (born 1 July 2000), sometimes known as Clave, is a Spanish professional footballer who plays as a midfielder for CF Sant Rafel.

Club career
Born in Madrid, Claverías joined Real Madrid's La Fábrica in 2007, aged seven, from ED Moratalaz. He left the side in 2018, and spent a short period on trial at FC Barcelona before joining CD Leganés.

In 2019, after finishing his formation, Claverías moved to CD Móstoles URJC and was initially assigned to the reserves in the Preferente de Madrid. On 1 July 2020, he was definitely promoted to the main squad in Tercera División.

On 15 July 2021, Claverías signed for UD Ibiza, being assigned to the farm team in Tercera División RFEF. He made his first team debut the following 29 May, starting and scoring his side's first in a 2–3 Segunda División away loss against Real Oviedo.

References

External links
 Real Madrid profile 
 
 
 

2000 births
Living people
Footballers from Madrid
Spanish footballers
Association football midfielders
Segunda División players
Tercera División players
Tercera Federación players
Divisiones Regionales de Fútbol players
CD Móstoles URJC players
CF Sant Rafel players
UD Ibiza players